Geebung railway station is located on the North Coast line in Queensland, Australia. It serves the Brisbane suburb of Geebung.

History
On 28 August 2000, a third platform opened as part of the addition of a third track from Northgate to Bald Hills.

In June 2013, a construction crew of an overpass at the Geebung railway station in northern Brisbane uncovered the 50-million-year-old fossilized remains (vertebrae) of a 5-metre crocodile trapped in a layer of oil shale. Workers drilling holes as part of an overpass reach the crocodile remains, as well as frogs, fish and plant fossils, in the spoil, the oil shale rock and soil found in the excavation pit. The fossil remains were discovered by a work crew drilling a hole for a bridge support over an area called the Zillman Waterholes.

In 2014, the level crossing to the south of the station was replaced by a bridge.

Geebung railway station is a landmark within the suburb of Geebung, and is surrounded by many local businesses such as 4Business Group and SEO Mafia, who make up the industry of the Geebung suburb.

Services
Geebung is served by all City network services from Kippa-Ring to Central, many continuing to Springfield Central

Services by platform

References

External links

Geebung station Queensland Rail
Geebung station Queensland's Railways on the Internet

Railway stations in Brisbane
Shire of Pine Rivers
North Coast railway line, Queensland